The 1985 Chicago White Sox season was the White Sox's 86th season. They finished with a record of 85–77, good enough for 3rd place in the American League West, 6 games behind the 1st place Kansas City Royals.

Offseason 
 October 19, 1984: Guy Hoffman was released by the White Sox.
 October 19, 1984: Casey Parsons was released by the White Sox.
 December 7, 1984: Bert Roberge was traded by the White Sox to the Montreal Expos for Bryan Little.
 January 12, 1985: Steve Fireovid was signed as a free agent by the White Sox.
 January 14, 1985: Dave Wehrmeister was signed as a free agent by the White Sox.
 March 23, 1985: Oscar Gamble was signed as a free agent by the Chicago White Sox.

Regular season 
 September 22, 1985: José Canseco became the 27th player to hit a home run over the roof of Comiskey Park.

1985 Opening Day lineup 
 Ozzie Guillén, SS
 Rudy Law, LF
 Harold Baines, RF
 Greg Walker, 1B
 Ron Kittle, DH
 Luis Salazar, 3B
 Daryl Boston, CF
 Marc Hill, C
 Julio Cruz, 2B
 Tom Seaver, P

Standings

Record vs. opponents

Notable transactions 
 April 1, 1985: Jerry Dybzinski was released by the Chicago White Sox.
 June 3, 1985: 1985 Major League Baseball draft
 The Chicago White Sox drafted catcher Kurt Brown with the fifth overall pick in the 1985 Draft.
 Bobby Thigpen was drafted by the White Sox in the 4th round.
 Tom Drees was drafted by the White Sox in the 17th round.
 Randy Velarde was drafted by the White Sox in the 19th round. Player signed June 14, 1985.
 June 26, 1985: Mike Stanton was signed as a free agent by the White Sox.
 July 17, 1985: Bob Owchinko was purchased by the Chicago White Sox from the Oakland Athletics.
 August 12, 1985: Oscar Gamble was released by the White Sox.
 August 12, 1985: Mike Stanton was released by the White Sox.
 September 24, 1985: Bob Owchinko was released by the Chicago White Sox.

Roster

Player stats

Batting 
Note: G = Games played; AB = At bats; R = Runs scored; H = Hits; 2B = Doubles; 3B = Triples; HR = Home runs; RBI = Runs batted in; BB = Base on balls; SO = Strikeouts; AVG = Batting average; SB = Stolen bases

Pitching 
Note: W = Wins; L = Losses; ERA = Earned run average; G = Games pitched; GS = Games started; SV = Saves; IP = Innings pitched; H = Hits allowed; R = Runs allowed; ER = Earned runs allowed; HR = Home runs allowed; BB = Walks allowed; K = Strikeouts

Farm system

External links 
 1985 Chicago White Sox at Baseball Reference

References 

 

Chicago White Sox seasons
Chicago White Sox season
Chicago